The Alaska Scenic Byways Program is a program designated by the Alaska Department of Transportation and Public Facilities (DOT&PF) that is used to recognize and protect the most scenic, historic, and recreational highways located in the U.S. state of Alaska. Recognized roadways may also be National Scenic Byways and National Forest Scenic Byways, both designated by the federal government, in addition to being Alaska Scenic Byways, which are designated by the state. The Alaska Scenic Byway system was created to recognize and protect Alaska's most important recreational highways.

List

See also

References

External links
Alaska's Scenic Byways official website from the Alaska Department of Transportation & Public Facilities

Alaska
Scenic